The following is a list of Canisius Golden Griffins men's basketball head coaches. There have been 24 head coaches of the Golden Griffins in their 117-season history.

Canisius' current head coach is Reggie Witherspoon. He was hired as the Golden Griffins' head coach in May 2016, replacing Jim Baron, who retired after the 2015–16 season.

References

Canisius

Canisius Golden Griffins men's basketball coaches